Ri Gun-sang is a former international table tennis player from North Korea.

He won a bronze medal at the 1987 World Table Tennis Championships in the Swaythling Cup (men's team event) with Hong Chol, Kim Song-hui and Chu Jong-Chol for North Korea.

Two years later he won another bronze at the 1989 World Table Tennis Championships with Kim Song-hui, Chu Jong-Chol and Yun Mun-Song.

He competed in the 1992 Olympics and 1996 Olympics.

See also
 List of table tennis players
 List of World Table Tennis Championships medalists

References

North Korean male table tennis players
1966 births
Living people
Table tennis players at the 1992 Summer Olympics
Table tennis players at the 1996 Summer Olympics
Asian Games medalists in table tennis
Table tennis players at the 1990 Asian Games
Asian Games silver medalists for North Korea
Medalists at the 1990 Asian Games
World Table Tennis Championships medalists
20th-century North Korean people